Sir George Steuart Mackenzie, 7th Baronet FRS FRSE FSA (22 June 1780–26 October 1848) was a Scottish geologist, chemist and agricultural improver.

Life
The only son of Major General Sir Alexander Mackenzie of Coul (d.1796), a General in the Bengal Army, by his wife Katharine Ramsay (d.1806), daughter of Robert Ramsay of Camno, he was born on 22 June 1780. He was tutored privately then spent one year at Edinburgh's High School (1795/6). He then studied sciences at the University of Edinburgh.

In 1796 he succeeded to the baronetcy aged 16, on the death of his father. He first became known to the scientific world in 1800, when he claimed a proof of the identity of diamond with carbon by a series of experiments on the formation of steel by the combination of diamonds with iron; in these experiments he is said to have made free use of his mother's jewels. In 1799 he was elected a Fellow of the Royal Society of Edinburgh. His proposers were Sir James Hall, John Playfair and Thomas Charles Hope. He served as Vice-President of the Society 1844 to 1848. In 1815, 16 years after his fellowship of the Edinburgh Society, he was also elected a Fellow of the Royal Society of London. He was also President of the Caledonian Horticultural Society.

Pupil and friend of Robert Jameson, Mackenzie devoted much time to the study of mineralogy and geology. His interest in those subjects led him in 1810 to undertake a journey to Iceland, when he was accompanied by Henry Holland and Richard Bright. To illustrate the conclusions he had formed with regard to the geology of Iceland, Mackenzie visited the Faroe Islands in 1812, and on his return read an account of his observations before the Edinburgh Royal Society.

He was also the landowner responsible for the clearances of the townships of Inverlael and Balblair near Ullapool in the winter of 1819-20, as part of the wider Highland Clearances. The clearances saw hundreds of families moved off land by landowners to make way for large-scale sheep production or other agricultural uses. Some families moved to other parts of Scotland, while others emigrated - many to Canada where their hardships continued. Evictions could be violent, and communities were forced to give up homes and land where generations of people had lived and worked

Mackenzie died at his home, Kinellan House, in western Edinburgh, on 26 October 1848. His home is now subdivided as flats.

Works
In 1811, Bright, Holland and Mackenzie published Travels in Iceland; Mackenzie contributed the narrative of the voyage and the travels, and the chapters on the mineralogy, rural economy, and commerce of the island. It was favourably reviewed by Robert Southey (Quarterly Review, vii. 48–92). In this book Mackenzie first proposed explanation of periodic eruptions of geyser; he envisaged a geyser plumbing system that includes a large cavern connected to the ground surface by a highly contorted conduit.

Mackenzie drew up a report for the Board of Agriculture: General View of the Agriculture of Ross and Cromarty, 1813. From 1826 to 1848 he contributed numerous papers to the discussion of the origin of the Parallel Roads of Lochaber, however his views did not gain acceptance. He also wrote:

 Treatise on the Diseases and Management of Sheep. With … an Appendix containing documents exhibiting the value of the merino breed, Inverness, 1807.
 Travels in the Island of Iceland during the Summer of the Year MDCCCX, Edinburgh, 1811.
 An Account of some Geological Facts observed in the Faroe Islands.Transact. of the Royal Soc. of Edinburgh. Vol. VII. 1815. p. 213
 An Essay on some Subjects connected with Taste, Edinburgh, 1817; 2nd edit. 1842.
 Illustrations of Phrenology. With Engravings, Edinburgh, 1820.
 Documents laid before … Lord Glenelg … relative to the Convicts sent to New South Wales, Edinburgh, 1836.
 General Observations on the Principles of Education, &c. Edinburgh, 1836.
 On the most Recent Disturbance of the Crust of the Earth in respect to its Suggesting an Hypothesis to Account for the Origin of Glaciers (Edinb. New Phil. Journ.'' xxxiii. 1–9).

Family
Mackenzie married, first, 8 June 1802, Mary Macleod (d.1835), fifth daughter of Donald Macleod of Geanies, sheriff of Ross-shire, by whom he had seven sons and three daughters. The fourth son Robert Ramsay Mackenzie became Premier of Queensland. Following her death (13 January 1835) he married in the following year, Catherine Jardine (d.1857), second daughter of Sir Henry Jardine of Harwood, and widow of Captain John Street of the Royal Artillery, by whom he had one son.

His first wife's sister, Isabella Macleod, was married to James Gregory.

Honours
Mackenzie Bay in Greenland was named in his honour by William Scoresby (1789 – 1857).

References

Attribution

External links
CERL page

1780 births
1848 deaths
Scottish mineralogists
Baronets in the Baronetage of Nova Scotia
Fellows of the Royal Society
Phrenologists